The Central Washington Railroad (reporting mark CWRR) is a common freight carrier that operates in the Yakima, Washington area. The shortline railroad operates  on two routes in the Yakima River valley and is owned by the Temple family, which also owns the Columbia Basin Railroad.

Route

The CWRR's northern route connects the communities of Fruitvale, Yakima, Union Gap and Moxee City.

The CWRR's southern route connects the communities of Granger, Sunnyside, Grandview and Prosser.

See also

List of Washington railroads

References

External links

Washington (state) railroads